Taube, Taubes, Taub or Taubs, may refer to:

People
 Taube, a surname
 Taub, a surname
 Taubes, a surname
 Teyber, Austrian family of musicians sometimes spelled this way
 Taube family, a Baltic German noble family

Places
 Taube (river), in Saxony-Anhalt, Germany

Vehicles
 Airdrome Taube, an American amateur-built aircraft
 Etrich Taube, a pre-World War I monoplane aircraft
 SS Taube, a later name of the 964 GRT coaster SS Jean Marie

Other uses
 Taube Museum of Art, Downtown Minot, North Dakota
 The Taube Foundation for Jewish Life & Culture, in Belmont, California
 Die Taube, a 1988 novella by Patrick Süskind

See also
 Daub (disambiguation)
 Tauber (surname)